Anton Burghardt (born 9 June 1942) is a former German football player and manager.

Burghardt made 60 appearances in the Bundesliga for MSV Duisburg during his playing career.

References

External links 
 

1942 births
Living people
German footballers
Association football defenders
Bundesliga players
Kickers Offenbach players
Bayer 04 Leverkusen players
1. FSV Mainz 05 players
1. FC Pforzheim players
1. FC Saarbrücken players
MSV Duisburg players
German football managers
Hannover 96 managers
Tennis Borussia Berlin managers
DSC Wanne-Eickel managers